Clayton is a village in Adams County, Illinois, United States. As of the 2020 census, the total population was 639 people, down from 709 at the 2010 census. It is part of the Quincy, IL–MO Micropolitan Statistical Area.

History
Clayton is named for Kentucky statesman Henry Clay. It was established in 1834.

Registered Historic Places
 John Roy Site

Geography

Demographics

As of the 2020 census there were 639 people, 300 households, and 181 families residing in the village. The racial makeup of the village was 92.80% White, 1.41% African American, 0.47% Asian, 0.47% from other races, and 4.85% from two or more races. Hispanic or Latino of any race were 1.88% of the population.

There were 300 households, out of which 37.33% had children under the age of 18 living with them, 37.33% were married couples living together, 15.33% had a female householder with no husband present, and 39.67% were non-families. 35.33% of all households were made up of individuals, and 14.67% had someone living alone who was 65 years of age or older. The average household size was 2.35 and the average family size was 1.95.

The village's age distribution consisted of 20.0% under the age of 18, 10.4% from 18 to 24, 20.8% from 25 to 44, 23.8% from 45 to 64, and 24.8% who were 65 years of age or older. The median age was 44.4 years. For every 100 females, there were 102.4 males. For every 100 females age 18 and over, there were 96.6 males.

The median income for a household in the village was $44,583, and the median income for a family was $53,015. Males had a median income of $42,083 versus $17,679 for females. The per capita income for the village was $25,220. About 17.1% of families and 21.4% of the population were below the poverty line, including 20.5% of those under age 18 and 15.2% of those age 65 or over.

Notable people

 John Anderson (1922-1992), actor, born in Clayton
 Vivian Hickey (1916-2016), Illinois state senator and educator, born in Clayton
 Mary K. Meany (1897-2000), Illinois state representative, born in Clayton

References

External links
 Village of Clayton official website
 Early history of Clayton

Villages in Adams County, Illinois
Quincy, Illinois micropolitan area
Villages in Illinois
1834 establishments in Illinois